Mi goreng may refer to:
 Mie goreng, Indonesian fried noodle
 Mee goreng, Bruneian, Malaysian, or Singaporean fried noodle